Aleksy Kuziemski (born 9 May 1977) is a Polish professional boxer and light heavyweight world title challenger.

Amateur career
As an amateur, Kuziemski for Astoria Bydgoszcz won a bronze medal at the 2003 World Amateur Boxing Championships in the light heavyweight division, and another bronze at the 2004 European Amateur Boxing Championships. He then participated in the 2004 Summer Olympics, where he lost in the first round of the light heavyweight division to Beibut Shumenov.

Professional career
On 22 August 2009, Kuziemski challenged Jürgen Brähmer for the WBO interim light heavyweight title. Brähmer won by eleventh-round stoppage. On 21 May 2011, Kuziemski challenged Nathan Cleverly for the WBO world light heavyweight title, but was stopped in four rounds.

Professional boxing record

| style="text-align:center;" colspan="8"|28 fights, 23 wins (7 knockouts), 5 losses
|-  style="text-align:center; background:#e3e3e3;"
|  style="border-style:none none solid solid; "|Res.
|  style="border-style:none none solid solid; "|Record
|  style="border-style:none none solid solid; "|Opponent
|  style="border-style:none none solid solid; "|Type
|  style="border-style:none none solid solid; "|Round
|  style="border-style:none none solid solid; "|Date
|  style="border-style:none none solid solid; "|Location
|  style="border-style:none none solid solid; "|Notes
|-align=center
|-align=center
|Loss
|align=center|23-5||align=left| Jean Pascal
|
|
|
|align=left|
|align=left| 
|-align=center
|Win
|align=center|23-4||align=left| Leo Tchoula
|
|
|
|align=left|
|align=left| 
|-align=center
|Loss
|align=center|22-4||align=left| Doudou Ngumbu
|
|
|
|align=left|
|align=left| For vacant WBF Light heavyweight title.
|-align=center
|Win
|align=center|22-3||align=left| Roman Vanicky
|
|
|
|align=left|
|align=left| 
|-align=center
|Loss
|align=center|21-3||align=left| Nathan Cleverly
|
|
|
|align=left|
|align=left| For WBO Light heavyweight title.
|-align=center
|Win
|align=center|21-2||align=left| Arturs Kulikauskis
|
|
|
|align=left|
|align=left| 
|-align=center
|Win
|align=center|20-2||align=left| Dmitri Protkunas
|
|
|
|align=left|
|align=left| 
|-align=center
|Loss
|align=center|19-2||align=left| Dmitry Sukhotsky
|
|
|
|align=left|
|align=left| 
|-align=center
|Win
|align=center|19-1||align=left| Igor Mikhalkin
|
|
|
|align=left|
|align=left| Won vacant German International Light heavyweight title.
|-align=center
|Win
|align=center|18-1||align=left| Lars Buchholz
|
|
|
|align=left|
|align=left| 
|-align=center
|Loss
|align=center|17-1||align=left| Jürgen Brähmer
|
|
|
|align=left|
|align=left| For interim WBO Light heavyweight title.
|-align=center
|Win
|align=center|17-0||align=left| Armin Dollinger
|
|
|
|align=left|
|align=left| 
|- align=center
|Win
|align=center|16–0||align=left| Mantas Tarvydas
|
|
|
|align=left|
|align=left| 
|- align=center
|Win
|align=center|15–0||align=left| Jevgenijs Andrejevs
|
|
|
|align=left|
|align=left| 
|- align=center
|Win
|align=center|14–0||align=left| Peter Venancio
|
|
|
|align=left|
|align=left|
|- align=center
|Win
|align=center|13–0||align=left| Julio Cesar Dominguez
|
|
|
|align=left|
|align=left| 
|- align=center
|Win
|align=center|12–0||align=left| Ladislav Kutil
|
|
|
|align=left|
|align=left|
|- align=center
|Win
|align=center|11–0||align=left| Karim Bennama
|
|
|
|align=left|
|align=left|
|- align=center
|Win
|align=center|10–0||align=left| Roman Vanicky
|
|
|
|align=left|
|align=left|
|- align=center
|Win
|align=center|9–0||align=left| Sergey Karanevich
|
|
|
|align=left|
|align=left|
|- align=center
|Win
|align=center|8–0||align=left| Mahamed Ariphadzhieu
|
|
|
|align=left|
|align=left|
|- align=center
|Win
|align=center|7–0||align=left| Christopher Robert
|
|
|
|align=left|
|align=left|
|- align=center
|Win
|align=center|6–0||align=left| Artem Solomko
|
|
|
|align=left|
|align=left|
|- align=center
|Win
|align=center|5–0||align=left| Dario Cichello
|
|
|
|align=left|
|align=left|
|- align=center
|Win
|align=center|4–0||align=left| Enad Licina
|
|
|
|align=left|
|align=left|
|- align=center
|Win
|align=center|3–0||align=left| Alexander Beroshvili
|
|
|
|align=left|
|align=left|
|- align=center
|Win
|align=center|2–0||align=left| Radek Seman
|
|
|
|align=left|
|align=left|
|- align=center
|Win
|align=center|1–0||align=left| Mayala Mbungi
|
|
|
|align=left|
|align=left|
|- align=center

References

External links
https://sports.yahoo.com/olympics/athens2004/pol/Aleksy+Kuziemski/9004164
Aleksy Kuziemski at Sports Reference

1977 births
Living people
Heavyweight boxers
Boxers at the 2004 Summer Olympics
Olympic boxers of Poland
Astoria Bydgoszcz members
People from Świecie
Sportspeople from Kuyavian-Pomeranian Voivodeship
Polish male boxers
AIBA World Boxing Championships medalists
20th-century Polish people
21st-century Polish people